Conversion kit may refer to:

Arcade conversion kit, which is used to change the game an arcade machine plays
Miniature conversion kit, equipment used to alter game pieces for miniature, tabletop games.
Pinball conversion kit, which is used to re-theme a pinball machine 
Vehicle conversion kit, used for electric vehicle conversion